Kenji Tanaka may refer to:

 Kenji Tanaka (footballer, born 1983), Japanese football goalkeeper
 Kenji Tanaka (footballer, born 2001), Brazilian football forward

See also
 Keiji Tanaka (born 1994), Japanese figure skater